Matthew Turk is the President of the Toyota Technological Institute at Chicago, and a professor emeritus and former department chair of the Department of Computer Science and the Media Arts and Technology Program at the University of California, Santa Barbara, California. He was named a Fellow of the Institute of Electrical and Electronics Engineers (IEEE) in 2013 for his contributions to computer vision and perceptual interfaces. In 2014, Turk was also named a Fellow of the International Association for Pattern Recognition (IAPR) for his contributions to computer vision and vision based interaction. In January 2021, he was named a Fellow of the Association for Computing Machinery (ACM) for contributions to face recognition, computer vision, and multimodal interaction.

Turk received a PhD at the MIT Media Lab in 1991.

References

External links
Matthew Turk's Homepage

Fellow Members of the IEEE
Living people
University of California, Santa Barbara faculty
21st-century American engineers
Fellows of the International Association for Pattern Recognition
Year of birth missing (living people)